The Southern Cross or Crux, a constellation visible in the Southern Hemisphere, is depicted on flags and coats of arms of various countries and sub-national entities. This star constellation is visible mostly in the southern hemisphere and it therefore symbolises the southern location of its users.

The term Southern Cross can also refer to the blue saltire as used in various flags of the Confederate States of America in the American Civil War.

This list is an incomplete list and some of the flags in this list might not have official status. Flag proportions may vary between the different flags, and sometimes even vary between different versions of the same flag.

National flags of countries in the Southern Hemisphere

Other flags of the Commonwealth of Australia

Other flags of the Federative Republic of Brazil

Other flags of the Realm of New Zealand

Other flags of Papua New Guinea

Other flags in South America

Other flags with the Southern Cross

See also 

 Nordic Cross Flag
 Union Flag

References 

Southern Cross
Cross symbols